Komárom-Esztergom is an administrative Hungarian county in Central Transdanubia Region; its shares its northern border the Danube with Slovakia. Its county seat is Tatabánya.

History

Middle Ages
The predecessor of Komárom Esztergom County, Komárom county and Esztergom county were founded by Stephen I of Hungary. Both counties had parts that now belong to Slovakia. Throughout their history the borders of the two counties were frequently modified, and they were merged several times as well. When the castle of Esztergom was captured by the Ottomans in 1543, the leadership of the county fled from there. The castles of Érsekújvár, Komárom, and Tata were the three border castles stopping the Ottoman conquest for long decades. During the Ottoman occupation of Hungary, Esztergom became the center of a sanjak spanning across several counties. Komárom county on the other hand was continuously functioning, its castle was never captured by the conquering armies. The general assembly of nobles in Esztergom county was reintroduced after the liberation of the city from the Ottomans, by armies led by John III Sobieski in 1696. The assembly was dissolved in both counties during Rákóczi's War of Independence, and then it was reformed after the war, in Esztergom county in 1710 and in Komárom county in 1712.

Esztergom county was one of the two counties in which the leadership consisted of common nobles and not religious and political leaders (the other one being Pest-Pilis-Solt-Kiskun county). They were not granted the rank of lord-lieutenant unlike the leaders of other counties; they could only acquire vice-ispán and other lower ranks. The two counties were first merged in 1786 by Joseph II, with the new center being Tata. The merged county was separated after his death in 1790, and both Esztergom and Komárom were granted the rank of county center. The noble leadership was replaced by county commissions in both counties in May 1848. The county commission of Komárom county functioned until the end of the war of independence of 1848-1849, but the commission of Esztergom county was disrupted by the occupation of imperial troops on 15 January 1849. After the war the leadership of the counties was headed by Imperial–royal commissioners. In 1851 the parts of the counties that lay on the souther bank of the Danube were reorganized as Esztergom county with Esztergom as its center, and the parts on the northern bank were reorganized as Komárom county with Komárom as its center. These reformed counties only existed until 1860. After that the county commissions elected in 1848 restored them to their previous state. Towards the end of the 19th century, two towns in Komárom county — Lábatlan and Piszke — were added to Esztergom county, during the reorganization of counties in 1876.

20th century
In January 1919 the Czechoslovak Legion occupied the towns of Párkány and Komárom on the northern bank of the Danube. The workers' council and directory of Esztergom county were formed in its county center, while the directory of Komárom county was formed in New Komárom on the southern bank of the Danube.

After the Treaty of Trianon the northern parts of the two counties became parts of Czechoslovakia. After the treaty 44 villages from the former Komárom county and 22 towns from the former Esztergom county stayed in Hungary. In 1923 the two counties were merged under the name "Administratively pre-merged county of Komárom and Esztergom". After the First Vienna Award in 1938, the two counties were restored to their former size. The size of Komárom county also increased significantly because the area of Csallóköz, which previously belonged to Pozsony county, was also added to it, so it consisted of six districts now, as opposed to the previous four. 

As a consequence of the temporary armistice following World War II the 1937 borders of the country were restored. Due to this a temporary administrative reorganization was conducted, where the previous Komárom and Esztergom counties were now merged for a last time under the name Komárom-Esztergom county.

Demographics

In 2015, it had a population of 299,110 and the population density was 132/km².

Ethnicity

Hungarians constitute the majority of the population. The chief minorities are ethnic Germans (approx. 9,000), Roma (4,000) and Slovaks (3,000).

Total population (2011 census): 304,568
Ethnic groups (2011 census):
Identified themselves: 270 933 persons:
Hungarians: 252 432 (93,13%)
Germans: 9 168 (3,38%)
Gypsies: 4 261 (1,57%)
Slovaks: 3 174 (1,17%)
Others and indefinable: 1 898 (0,70%)
Approx. 48,000 persons in Komárom-Esztergom County did not declare an ethnic group at the 2011 census.

Religion

Religious adherence in the county according to 2011 census:

Catholic – 111,919 (Roman Catholic – 110,656; Greek Catholic – 1,227);
Reformed – 30,517; 
Evangelical – 4,505; 
other religions – 4,101; 
Non-religious – 61,384; 
Atheism – 4,262;
Undeclared – 87,880.

Regional structure

Politics 

The Komárom-Esztergom County Council, elected at the 2014 local government elections, is made up of 15 counselors, with the following party composition:

Presidents of the General Assembly

Municipalities 
Komárom-Esztergom County has 1 urban county, 11 towns, 3 large villages and 61 villages.

The county is ranked second in terms of population density among counties in Hungary: 66% of people live in towns.

Cities with county rights
(ordered by population, as of 2011 census)
Tatabánya (67,753) – county seat

Towns

Esztergom (28,926)
Tata (23,575)
Komárom (19,284)
Oroszlány (18,446)
Dorog (12,199)
Nyergesújfalu (7,621)
Ács (6,875)
Kisbér (5,564)
Tát (5,302)
Lábatlan (5,033)
Bábolna (3,808)

Villages

Aka
Almásfüzitő
Annavölgy
Ácsteszér
Ászár
Baj
Bajna
Bajót
Bakonybánk
Bakonysárkány
Bakonyszombathely
Bana
Bársonyos
Bokod
Csatka
Császár
Csém
Csép
Csolnok
Dad
Dág
Dömös
Dunaalmás
Dunaszentmiklós
Epöl
Ete
Gyermely
Héreg
Kecskéd
Kerékteleki
Kesztölc
Kisigmánd
Kocs
Kömlőd
Környe
Leányvár
Máriahalom
Mocsa
Mogyorósbánya
Nagyigmánd 
Nagysáp
Naszály
Neszmély
Piliscsév
Pilismarót
Réde
Sárisáp
Süttő
Súr
Szákszend
Szárliget
Szomód
Szomor
Tardos
Tarján
Tárkány
Tokod 
Tokodaltáró
Úny
Várgesztes
Vérteskethely
Vértessomló
Vértesszőlős
Vértestolna

 municipalities are large villages.

Gallery

References

External links
 Official site in Hungarian, English and German
 24 Óra (kemma.hu) - The county portal

 
Counties of Hungary